The list of University of Akron people includes notable alumni and faculty of the University of Akron.  Class year usually indicates year of graduation, unless an entry is denoted by an asterisk (*).  In this case, the student did not graduate from the university, and the class year indicates the last known year a former student attended.  In the case of alumni with multiple graduation years, the earliest graduation year is shown.

Alumni

Athletics

 

 Kwan Cheatham (born 1995), basketball player for Ironi Nes Ziona of the Israel Basketball Premier League

Politics and government

Other

Faculty and staff

Athletic coaches

Faculty and administrators

References

External links

University of Akron people
University of Akron
University of Akron people